Sindhi Language Authority (SLA) is an autonomous body under the administrative control of the Culture Tourism and Antiquities Department of the Government of Sindh province in Pakistan. SLA was established under the act Use of Sindhi Language Act 1972, and the Teaching, Promotion and Use of Sindhi Language (Amendment) Act, 1990 of Government of Sindh Provincial Assembly. There is a Board of Governors to frame the policies for achieving the aims and objectives of authority and ensure their implementation. First Board of Governors was constituted under the chairmanship of renowned scholar and writer Dr. Nabi Bux Khan Baloch.

Since the establishment of the Sindhi Language Authority, different scholars and writers were appointed as its chairman, who have contributed to the development and promotion of the Sindhi language.

Objectives
SLA considers ways and means for the promotion, teaching and use of Sindhi. Moreover, it maintains and reinforce the status of  the Sindhi language at all levels  in the official and semi-official records. SLA also ensures the correct use of Sindhi language in official records, manuals, publications, text books, newspapers, television and radio, periodic publications and other permanent documents.

Organization
Sindhi Language Authority’s organizational structure consists of seven sections for achieving its objectives which are: Publication & Research Section which deals all kinds of books publication, research journals and magazines, Program Sections which arranges day to day planned programs, dramas linguistic seminars and symposiums, Encyclopedia Sindhiana which has vital team of researchers who collects data from all over the Sindh and compile it in alphabetically order and publish it in series of the Encyclopedia, Dictionary Section deals the etymology and compilation of the Sindhi Language thesaurus, Language Development Project section (Planning & development) arranges the helping seminars and add-on sittings with Literary and academics departments under the umbrella of Government of Sindh for development & implementing Sindhi Language in institutions, Muhammad Ibrahim Joyo Audio & Video Studio where multimedia programs, interviews and tradition folk literary people of Sindh shares their creative skills poetry and Sindhi Folk wisdom and  Sindhi Informatics section develops web portals of Sindhi Literature & Sindhi programming of digitization in Sindhi Computing.

Activities
The major thrust of the Authority’s activities has been focused on three fronts, Publication, Programs and Sindhi Computing, in order to achieve its basic aims and objectives and bring Sindhi language at far with other developed languages of the world.
On the publication and research front, Encyclopedia Sindhiana, Dictionaries, Classical Sindhi book, books for children research material on Sindhi language and literature Indus script and Indus civilization etc and other different descriptions have been published.
The Program side arranges seminars, symposiums, lectures, training workshops and conferences on various subjects relating to the promotion, teaching and use of Sindhi language. Similarly, “Ibrahim Joyo AV Studio” has prepared significant AV material regarding preservation of dialects and sub- dialects of Sindhi language.
Institute of Sindhi Computing is the youngest section of the Authority. Yet it has achieved progress in Sindhi Computing. It has launched several Android based mobile applications. Moreover Sindhi language has been registered on Microsoft cloud and added Sindhi language in core programming of google. SLA is also the member of Microsoft Partnership Networks.
On 21 February 2017, SLA launched first Sindhi Optical character recognition by the Team leader Amar Fayaz Buriro who was continuously working on this project and finally launched its first beta version.

The authority established Sindhi Dictionary Board for the compilation of dictionary.

The Authority wrote letters to the private schools of the province to teach Sindhi language subject in their schools and it also demanded to write sign boards on the national highways and road in Sindhi.

Sindhi language

Sindhi is one of the major languages of Pakistan, spoken in the province of Sindh by approximately forty million people. It is one of the oldest languages of the sub-continent with a rich culture, vast folklore and extensive literature.

Linguistic boundaries
Sindhi has extended its boundaries beyond the province of Sindh . In northern Sindh it flows over the north-west into Balochistan province, former Bahawalpur state (now in Punjab), on the west it is bounded by the mountain range separating Sindh from Balochistan.

This boundary has not been crossed by Sindhi, except in the southern part of the hilly area of Kohistan. Here in general, the language spoken is Balochi but Sindhi is also spoken by a large number of population. It is spoken as mother tongue in some parts of Balochistan. It has spread its influence still further towards the Persian Gulf in the Lasbella area of Balochistan and is spoken as a first language along with Makrani coast by a large number of people in Jadgal, Gwadar, Ormara and Pasni, and has crossed the Gulf and is spoken in Muskat, UAE and generally in the coastal region.

In the east and south-west, Sindhi has crossed the Rann of Kutch and is spoken by a large number of people in Kucch, Gujarat and the peninsula of Kathiawar in India. In the east, it has influenced the speech of the neighbouring parts of Marwar and Jaisalmir states of Rajasthan (Rajputana in India).

After the independence of Pakistan, numerous Sindhi Hindus migrated from Sindh and settled in the central and western parts of India and they speak Sindhi at home. In 2010, the estimated population of Sindhi Hindus in Ulhasnagar in India was 400,000. It is also spoken by approximately 400,000 people as their first language, in Tanzania, Kenya, Uganda, Congo, South Africa, Madagascar, East Africa, UK, US and Canada by those who have migrated from Sindh and settled there. It is also spoken in Hong Kong, Singapore, Thailand, Sri Lanka and in some other countries in Far-East and South East-Asia by those people who have settled there in the first quarter of the 20th century or even earlier.

List of SLA chairpersons 

Since the establishment of Sindhi Language Authority below mentioned Scholars were appointed as chairman.

List of SLA Secretaries 

Incumbency wise list of Secretaries in Sindhi Language Authority following Scholars, authors & literary figures were appointed as Secretary, whereas Ms. Razia Sultana Aka Shabnam Gul is the now at the position.

See also
 Sindhi language

References

External links

 
 Virtual Sindhi Books Library by Sindhi Language Authority (SLA)
 Online Sindhi Learning Portal by Sindhi Language Authority (SLA)
 Android apps developed by Sindhi Language Authority (SLA)
 Scholars demand national language status for Sindhi

Sindhi language
Language regulators
Government agencies of Sindh